The Greek-language inscriptions and epigraphy are a major source for understanding of the society, language and history of ancient Greece and other Greek-speaking or Greek-controlled areas. Greek inscriptions may occur on stone slabs, pottery ostraca, ornaments, and range from simple names to full texts.

Inscriptiones Graecae

The Inscriptiones Graecae (IG), Latin for Greek inscriptions, project is an academic project originally begun by the Prussian Academy of Science, and today continued by its successor organisation, the Berlin-Brandenburgische Akademie der Wissenschaften. Its aim is to collect and publish all known ancient inscriptions from the ancient world. As such it will eventually make all other previous collections redundant.

It is divided by regions.

I/II/III - Attica

IV - Aegina, Pityonesus, Cecryphalia, the Argolid

V - Laconia, Messenia and  Arcadia

VII -  Megarid, Oropus, and Boeotia

IX -  Aetolia, Acarnania, West Locris and Thessaly

X - Epirus, Macedonia, Thrace, Scythia, Thessalonica, Lyncestis, Heraclea, Pelagonia, Derriopus and Lychnidus

XIV - Sicily-Italy

Other printed collections
Numerous other printed collections of Greek inscriptions exist. The following abbreviations are as listed in the preface Epigraphical Publications to the Liddell-Scott-Jones lexicon:
 CGIH = Corpus der griechisch-christlichen Inschriften von Hellas: I. Die griechisch-christlichen Inschriften des Peloponnes, Nikos Athanasiou Bees, vol. i, Athens 1941.
 CID = Corpus des inscriptions de Delphes. I: Lois sacrées et règlements religieux, Georges Rougemont, Paris 1977; II: Les comptes du quatrième et du troisième siècle, J. Bousquet, D. Mulliez, Paris 1989.
 CIJud. = Corpus Inscriptionum Iudaicarum, ed. Jean-Baptiste Frey: vol. i (Europe), Rome 1936 repr. [New York 1975]; vol. ii: Asie-Afrique, Rome 1952.
 CISem. = Corpus Inscriptionum Semiticarum, E Renan et al., Paris 1881–1951.
 Inscr.Perg. = Die Inschriften von Pergamon (in Altertümer von Pergamon viii), ed. Max Fränkel, Berlin 1890–1895; 8(3) = Altertümer von Pergamon viii (3). Die Inschriften des Asklepieions, Christian Habicht (historian), Berlin 1969.
 Supp.Epigr. = SEG Supplementum Epigraphicum Graecum, Hondius, Netherlands

Online collections
Over the last 20 years, a growing number of online databases, catalogues and corpora of Greek inscriptions have been created. A selection is offered below:
 Searchable Greek Inscriptions of the Packard Humanities Institute, including the complete Inscriptiones Graecae corpora
 Inscriptiones Graecae homepage, in German
 Attic Inscriptions Online, including English translations
 Inscriptions of Aphrodisias, including English translations
 Hellenistic Greek Inscriptions, in English translation
 I.Sicily, inscriptions of Sicily
 Monumenta Asiae Minoris Antiqua (MAMA) XI, monuments from Phrygia and Lykaonia
 IGCyr, Inscriptions of Greek Cyrenaica
 EAGLE, a portal to the inscriptions of the Ancient World, part of IDEA
Some other inscriptions are found incidentally in
 TLG text materials are available online and in CD ROM format
 Perseus project 
 Duke Data Bank of Documentary Papyri

Digital resources
Alongside the development of online collections of Greek inscriptions, several projects have created online epigraphic tools for the study of inscriptions.
 Epigraphy.info, collaborative environment for digital epigraphy
 Trismegistos, portal of papyrological and epigraphical resources
 LGPN, the Lexicon of Greek Personal Names
 EpiDoc, XML text markup for ancient documents
 Ubi Erat Lupa, image database on ancient stone monuments
 Europeana EAGLE, Europeana network of Ancient Greek and Latin Epigraphy
 Digital Epigraphy Toolbox, 3D digitization of inscriptions
 Krateros, digital repository for the collections of epigraphic squeezes
 GIO, translations of Ancient Greek inscriptions into Modern Greek
 Pythia (machine learning), a deep learning model for the automatic restoration of Greek inscriptions

See also
 Epigraphy & (Section:Greek Inscriptions)
 Académie des Inscriptions et Belles-Lettres
 Leiden Conventions
 Centre for Ancient Epigraphy and Numismatics "Fanoula Papazoglou"
 Pythia (machine learning)
 EpiDoc

References

 
Greek epigraphy
Archaeological corpora
Ancient Greek